Gyllenstierna is a Swedish surname that may refer to:

Ebbe Gyllenstierna (1911–2003), Swedish Army officer and modern pentathlete
Christina Gyllenstierna (1494/5–1559), wife of Sten Sture the Younger and Swedish resistance leader 
Görwel Gyllenstierna (1646–1708), Swedish noblewoman duellist
Johan Göransson Gyllenstierna (1635–1680), Swedish statesman
Karin Gyllenstierna, 17th century Swedish courtier
Maria Gustava Gyllenstierna (1672–1737), Swedish countess, writer and translator
Margareta Gyllenstierna (1689–1740), Swedish political activist
Eric Gyllenstierna (1882–1940), Swedish diplomat
Elisabeth Gyllenstierna (1581-1646) Swedish court official

See also
Gyldenstierne (noble family)

Swedish-language surnames